James Baldwin (12 January 1922 – 1985) was an English professional footballer who made 268 appearances in the Football League playing as a defender for Blackburn Rovers and Leicester City. Baldwin then became player-manager of Eastern Counties League side Great Yarmouth Town, before leaving in 1957 to take the same role at Southern League side Yeovil Town.

References

1922 births
1985 deaths
Footballers from Blackburn
English footballers
Association football midfielders
Blackburn Rovers F.C. players
Leicester City F.C. players
Yeovil Town F.C. players
Great Yarmouth Town F.C. players
English Football League players
English football managers
Great Yarmouth Town F.C. managers
Yeovil Town F.C. managers